Mahonia zimapana is a shrub in the Berberidaceae described as a species in 1901. It is an uncommon species native to the States of Mexico and Hidalgo in Mexico.

References

External links

zimapana
Plants described in 1901
Flora of Mexico